Natmauk may refer to three places in Magway Region of Burma (Myanmar):

 Natmauk, town and the administrative seat of Natmauk Township
 Natmauk, Mindon Township, village in Mindon Township,
 Natmauk, Myayde Township, village in Aunglan (Myayde) Township